Duke Shèn of Chen (died 855 BC), given name Yurong (圉戎), was the fifth ruler of the ancient Chinese state of Chen during the Western Zhou dynasty. Shèn was his posthumous name.

Duke Shèn succeeded his father Duke Xiao of Chen. His reign coincided with that of King Li of Zhou. He died in 855 BC and was succeeded by his son Ning, known as Duke You of Chen.

References

Citations

Sources 
 

Monarchs of Chen (state)
9th-century BC Chinese monarchs
855 BC deaths